Desmosoma elegans is a species of isopods from the Island of Ischia in the Bay of Naples.

References

External links 
 

Asellota
Crustaceans described in 1969
Endemic arthropods of Italy
Ischia